Kesarpur  is a village in Kapurthala district of Punjab State, India. The village is administrated by a Sarpanch who is an elected representative of village as per the constitution of India and Panchayati raj (India).

Demography 
According to the report published by Census India in 2011, Kesarpur has 106 houses with the total population of 493 persons of which 247 are male and 246 females. Literacy rate of  Kesarpur is 74.49%, lower than the state average of 75.84%.  The population of children in the age group 0–6 years is 54 which is 10.95% of the total population. Child sex ratio is approximately 636, lower than the state average of 846.

Population data

References

External links 
  Villages in Kapurthala
 Kapurthala Villages List

Villages in Kapurthala district